The Siege of the Alcazar  or L'Assedio dell'Alcazar is a 1940 Italian war film directed by Augusto Genina about the famous siege of the Alcázar during the Spanish Civil War, set in Toledo, Spain. The film won the Mussolini Cup in Venice Film Festival for being the Best Italian Film. The film runs more in the Spanish dubbed version, it was restored by Filmoteca Española and released in DVD in Spain by Divisa Home Video. The film was shot in Cinecittà with Italian, French and Spanish actors. In the Italian version all three non-Italian actors (Mireille Balin, Rafael Calvo and Carlos Muñoz) spoke their lines in Italian. They were dubbed by Italian actors afterwards.

Plot
The Alcázar of Toledo is a historical fortification where the Spanish Infantry Academy was based and was held by Nationalists supporting the 18 July 1936 coup attempt against the Spanish Republic. The Republicans invested the Alcazar and besiege it for months against determined Nationalist resistance, before the siege was lifted by Franco forces with the Army of Africa under General José Enrique Varela.

Cast

Fosco Giachetti : Captain Vela
Mireille Balin : Carmen Herrera
María Denis : Conchita Álvarez
Rafael Calvo : Colonel José Moscardó Ituarte
Carlos Muñoz : Colonel Moscardò's son
 Aldo Fiorelli: Francisco 
 Andrea Checchi: Perro
 Carlo Tamberlani: Captain Vincenzo Alba
 Sivio Bagolini: Paolo Montez
 Checco Rissone: radiotelegrafista

Awards
The film won the Mussolini Cup in Venice Film Festival for being the Best Italian Film.

Releases
The Italian version was released in Italy in August 1940. The Spanish version of the film, known as Sin novedad en el Alcázar was released in Spain in October 1940. After the war, the film was re-released in Italy under the new title 'Alcazar' with significant cuts. All references to the involvement of Italy in the Spanish Civil War as well as the cruelty of the Republicans were excised to avoid any political debate.

Notes

External links
 
 http://worldcinemadirectory.co.uk/index.php/component/film/?id=751 

1940 films
1940s Italian-language films
Italian black-and-white films
Spanish black-and-white films
Films directed by Augusto Genina
Spanish Civil War films
Siege films
Italian propaganda films
Italian war films
1940 war films
Fascist propaganda
Films shot at Cinecittà Studios
1940s Italian films
Films set in Toledo, Spain